Talvar Bolaghi (also Romanized as Talvār Bolāghī) is a village in Kolah Boz-e Gharbi Rural District, in the Central District of Meyaneh County, East Azerbaijan Province, Iran. At the 2006 census, its population was 272, in 58 families.

References 

Populated places in Meyaneh County